Anriel Howard (born May 6, 1997) is an American professional wrestler currently signed to WWE where she performs on its NXT brand under the ring name Lash Legend. She is also a former college and professional (WNBA) basketball player.

Professional wrestling career 
Howard signed with WWE on December 2, 2020. On the September 21, 2021, episode of NXT, Howard made her televised debut during a backstage segment with Franky Monet, presenting herself as Lash Legend. On the September 28 episode of NXT, Legend began being regularly featured as host a pre-taped talk show segment, Lashing Out with Lash Legend. On the December 10 episode of 205 Live, Howard made her in-ring debut, defeating Amari Miller and establishing herself as a heel.

In February 2022, Legend and Miller confirmed they would team up to compete at the Women's Dusty Rhodes Tag Team Classic; however, the duo was lost in the first round to Io Shirai and Kay Lee Ray. On March 1, after both teams were argued each other, this led to a rematch where Legend defeated Miller. On March 8, at Roadblock, Legend interviewed Nikkita Lyons during Lashing Out with Lash Legend, resulting in the two having a heated argument. The two rival wrestlers faced each other on the April 5 and 26 episodes of NXT, where Legend lost to Lyons both times. At Spring Breakin', Legend and Natalya lost to Cora Jade and Lyons in a tag team match. Shortly after, Legend entered the NXT Women's Breakout Tournament; she lost to Roxanne Perez in the semifinals. After Alba Fyre defeated Tatum Paxley on the June 7 episode of NXT, Legend attacked, her starting a feud between the two. Legend lost to Fyre on the June 21 episode of NXT by disqualification after she attacked Fyre with the latter's bat and on the August 2 episode of NXT. Over the next few months, Legend would lose to the likes of Fallon Henley, Wendy Choo, Shotzi and  Lyra Valkyria while also failing to win title opportunities in battle royals.

References

External links 
 Lash Legend's WWE profile
 
 Mississippi State Lady Bulldogs bio
 Texas A&M Aggies bio
 
 

1997 births
Living people
21st-century professional wrestlers
Sportspeople from Atlanta
American female professional wrestlers
American women's basketball players
Forwards (basketball)
Texas A&M Aggies women's basketball players
Texas A&M Aggies women's track and field athletes
Mississippi State Bulldogs women's basketball players
Basketball players from Atlanta
Track and field athletes from Atlanta
Professional wrestlers from Georgia (U.S. state)